The 1900 Summer Olympics were held in Paris, France, from May 14 to October 28, 1900, as part of the 1900 World's Fair. 

A total of 997 athletes representing 24 nations participated in 95 events in 19 sports at these games. Women competed in the Olympics for the first time during the 1900 games. 21 of the 24 participating nations earned medals, in addition to 19 medals won by teams made up of athletes from multiple nations. The host nation of France flooded the field, comprising over 72% of all the athletes (720 of the 997); given this, America dominated athletically, winning the second-most gold (19), silver (14), and bronze (15) medals, while fielding 75 athletes.

In the early Olympic Games, several team events were contested by athletes from multiple nations. Retroactively, the IOC created the designation Mixed team (with the country code ZZX) to refer to these groups of athletes. During the 1900 games, athletes participating in mixed teams won medals in athletics, cricket, football, polo, rowing, rugby, sailing, tennis, tug of war, and water polo.

Gilt silver medals were awarded for 1st place in shooting, lifesaving, automobile racing and gymnastics. Whilst 2nd place silver medals were awarded in shooting, rowing, yachting, tennis, gymnastics, sabre, fencing, equestrian and athletics. With 3rd place bronze medals being awarded in gymnastics, firefighting and shooting. In many sports, however, medals were not awarded. With most of the listed prizes were cups and other similar trophies.

The International Olympic Committee has retrospectively assigned gold, silver, and bronze medals to competitors who earned first, second, and third-place finishes in order to bring early Olympics in line with current awards.

Medal count

This is the full table of the medal count of the 1900 Summer Olympics, based on the medal count of the International Olympic Committee (IOC). Before July 2021 the IOC has never decided which events were "Olympic" and which were not. These rankings use Olympic medal table sorting.

Notes and references

External links
 
 
 

Medal table
1900